Dave McEwen is an English former professional footballer who played for Tottenham Hotspur and Queens Park Rangers in the English Premier League.

Career
Signed from Dulwich Hamlet in March 2000, he initially shone in the Spurs reserves before appearing as an unused substitute against Wimbledon on 22 April. He then replaced Steffen Iversen for the final 20 minutes against Derby County in the following match. In January 2001 he made his final three substitute appearances against Everton, Southampton and West Ham United, replacing Willem Korsten, Les Ferdinand and Serhii Rebrov respectively.

His period at Spurs was unsuccessful, and he was eventually was replaced as a preferred reserve forward by Andy Booth. He left for Queens Park Rangers in August 2001.

References

1977 births
Living people
Footballers from the London Borough of Hackney
English footballers
Association football forwards
Crawley Town F.C. players
Tottenham Hotspur F.C. players
Queens Park Rangers F.C. players
Hertford Town F.C. players
Premier League players